Gazomètre is a Charleroi Metro station, located in Gilly (part of the Charleroi municipality), in fare zone 2. Gazomètre is an underground station featuring a central platform, with street access at the eastern end only.

While trams drive on the right on most of the Charleroi Pre-metro network, they drive on the left on the Gilly line, of which Gazomètre is part.

Nearby points of interest 
 ZAMI business park.

Transfers 
TEC Charleroi bus lines 14, 155 and 156.

Charleroi Metro stations
Railway stations opened in 1992